The 2016 Russian Artistic Gymnastics Championships was held in Penza, Russia between 28 March - 10 April 2016.

Medalists

European Championships Selection

Meldonium Incident 

On Saturday, April 2, new national champion Nikolai Kuksenkov was suspended from the Russian men's championships in Penza after it was revealed he tested positive for the banned substance meldonium. On Friday, April 15, the Russian Anti-Doping Agency notified the Russian Gymnastics Federation that it had officially lifted Kuksenkov's suspension, formally allowing him to return to competition. The news came after the World Anti-Doping Agency (WADA) admitted that "there is currently limited data available" on how long meldonium stays in the system after use.

References

External links
  Official site

2016 in gymnastics
Artistic Gymnastics Championships
Russian Artistic Gymnastics Championships
March 2016 sports events in Russia
April 2016 sports events in Russia